Texhomex is a marker showing the tri-point of Oklahoma, Texas and New Mexico. The marker is off U.S. Highway 56 about two miles east on Texas State Line Road at the corner of Oklahoma State Line Road, and is at an elevation of 4712 feet. There are no signs on Highway 56 in either direction.

The tri-state marker is in a pasture and can be accessed by walking over a cattle guard.

Other Nearby Geographic Points

The Northwest corner of the Texas panhandle is located 2.2 miles west of this point, which was due to originally a surveying error in 1859. The joint congressional resolution in 1911 declared the line surveyed by Clark to be the actual boundary line between Texas and New Mexico. The Northwest corner of the Texas panhandle had been previously marked but the marker was either removed or buried when the highway was widened in 2016.

The marker for the Cimarron Meridian is located approximately 100 feet north of the Texhomex corner, and is marked by a concrete pillar and a sign.

See also
 List of Oklahoma tri-points
 Four Corners Monument: monument on the Arizona-Colorado-New Mexico-Utah border
 International Boundary Marker: monument on the Louisiana-Texas border
 OKKAMO Tri-State Marker: monument on the Arkansas-Missouri-Oklahoma tripoint
 Preston Monument: monument on the Colorado-New Mexico-Oklahoma tripoint

References

External links
 "New Mexico - Oklahoma - Texas" David Mark's homepage Archived Dec. 8, 2012

Borders of Oklahoma
Borders of Texas
Borders of New Mexico
Buildings and structures in Union County, New Mexico
Monuments and memorials in Oklahoma
Buildings and structures in Cimarron County, Oklahoma
Geography of Dallam County, Texas
Monuments and memorials in Texas
Geography of Union County, New Mexico
Border tripoints
Monuments and memorials in New Mexico
Buildings and structures in Dallam County, Texas
Boundary markers